Nowe Bronowo  is a village in the administrative district of Gmina Stara Biała, within Płock County, Masovian Voivodeship, in east-central Poland.

In 2011 Novo Bronowo had a population of 127.
The village is located at 52°36'50?N 19°43'06?E  and has a post code of 09-411.

References

Nowe Bronowo